Beacon High School may refer to:
Beacon High School (Massachusetts), Watertown, Massachusetts
Beacon High School in Beacon, New York
The Beacon School, Manhattan, New York City